Pool B of the 2020 Billie Jean King Cup Americas Zone Group I was one of two pools in the Americas zone of the 2020–21 Billie Jean King Cup. Four teams competed in a round robin competition, with the top teams and the bottom teams proceeding to their respective sections of the play-offs: the top teams played for advanced to the 2020 Billie Jean King Cup Play-offs.

Standings 

Standings are determined by: 1. number of wins; 2. number of matches; 3. in two-team ties, head-to-head records; 4. in three-team ties, (a) percentage of matches won (head-to-head records if two teams remain tied), then (b) percentage of sets won (head-to-head records if two teams remain tied), then (c) percentage of games won (head-to-head records if two teams remain tied), then (d) Billie Jean King Cup rankings.

Round-robin

Argentina vs. Mexico

Chile vs. Peru

Argentina vs. Chile

Mexico vs. Peru

Argentina vs. Peru

Chile vs. Mexico

References

External links 
 Billie Jean King Cup website

2020–21 Billie Jean King Cup Americas Zone